Julius Kakeeto, is a Ugandan accountant, businessman, and bank executive. He has served as the managing director and chief executive officer of PostBank Uganda since November 2019. Before that, from 2015 until 2019, he was the managing director and CEO of Orient Bank, a Ugandan commercial bank.

Background and education
Julius Kakeeto was born at St. Francis Hospital Nsambya in Kampala, Uganda. He attended St. Mary's College Kisubi before entering Strathmore University, in Nairobi, Kenya, were he obtained his bachelor's degree. He holds a Master of Business Administration, from Manchester Business School, in the United Kingdom. He is a Fellow of the Association of Chartered Certified Accountants (FCCA) of the United Kingdom. He is also a member of the Institute of Certified Public Accountants of Uganda (ICPAU).

Career
Kakeeto worked with Ernst & Young from 1998 to 2000. He joined Citibank Uganda in 2000 rising to the role of Chief Financial Officer in the new subsidiary. Following that, he worked at the headquarters of Citibank's Africa Division in Johannesburg, South Africa. He then transferred to Citibank's offices in London initially in the Strategy and Planning team before transferring to the Investment Banking Division where he worked as a Vice President focusing on Emerging Markets. Before joining Orient Bank, he served as the Finance Director at Equity Bank (Uganda). In 2015, he was appointed the Chief Executive Officer at Orient Bank, having headed the institution in an acting capacity since 2014. Since then, he has improved Orient Bank from being the highest loss making bank in Uganda to the top half of the industry.

In 2019, Kakeeto was hired by PostBank Uganda, as the new managing director and chief executive officer, replacing Steven Mukweli who was battling corruption charges.

Since his appointment, he has led a restructuring process to reorganise the operations of the bank, resulting in the Central Bank granting PostBank with a Class 1 licence that allows it to operate as a fully fledged Tier 1 commercial bank.

See also
List of banks in Uganda
Banking in Uganda
Economy of Uganda

References

External links
 PostBank Uganda Homepage
 CEO Apprentices Graduate
 Orient Bank Raises War On Cybercrime

Living people
Alumni of the University of Manchester
Ganda people
Ugandan accountants
Ugandan bankers
Strathmore University alumni
Ugandan businesspeople
Ugandan chief executives
Ugandan business executives
Year of birth missing (living people)
People educated at St. Mary's College Kisubi
People from Central Region, Uganda